Sandstone Peak, also known as Mount Allen, is a mountain in Ventura County, California. Located near the western edge of the Santa Monica Mountains National Recreation Area, the summit provides panoramic views of Malibu, The Pacific Ocean, Santa Monica, the Conejo Valley, and four of the Channel Islands.

Background
The peak separates the drier inland valley from the coast facing side with higher humidity. The Sandstone Peak Trail, which leads to the top, connects to a vast trail system in the area, including the Backbone Trail. The mountain is highly popular with climbers, hikers, campers, and photographers.

The Boy Scouts of America petitioned the U.S. Board on Geographic Names to name the mountain for W. Herbert Allen, who had donated land for nearby Camp Circle X and other Boy Scout camps. He served as president of the Los Angeles Area Council.  The board denied the request because of a long-standing policy not to approve a geographic name in commemoration of a living person. The land is now known as the Circle X Ranch, a park unit located in the Santa Monica Mountains National Recreation Area.

Gallery

See also 
 Santa Monica Mountains
 Santa Monica Mountains National Recreation Area
 List of highest points in California by county
 Backbone Trail
 Chumash people

References

External links 
 
 

Scouting monuments and memorials
Mountains of Ventura County, California
Santa Monica Mountains National Recreation Area
Scouting in the United States